José Xavier de Cerveira e Sousa (27 November 1797 – 15 March 1862) was a Portuguese prelate,  bishop and professor at the University of Coimbra, he was bishops of Funchal, Beja and Viseu.

Biography
He was born in the town of Mogofores.

Bishop of Funchal
He was confirmed with the Bishop of Funchal on 14 June 1842, he was ordinated as bishop on 2 June 1844 and confirmed as Bishop of Funchal later on July 8 and succeeded D. Francisco José Rodrigues de Andrade.  He became its 22nd bishop and governed the diocese for nearly four years.  It faced a serious religious crisis that time which surrounded that society, namely the Protestant proselyte made by Dr. Robert Kalley.  D. Manuel (II) Martins Manso became bishop afterwards.

Bishop of Beja
He was transferred to the Diocese of Beja on the Portuguese mainland on 18 April 1849 and was confirmed with a bull of Pope Pius IX Romani Pontificis, on 28 September, he succeeded D. Manuel Pires de Azevedo Loureiro.   Under a proxy of  28 January 1850, he ordered Dr. Lobo Pimetel to take possession of the Beian Diocese which had the parish on 15 February.  After the death of Dr. Lobo Pimentel, he went to Lisbon for a provision where he named Father João Baptista da Silva vicar general.  A few months later on 10 August, he made a pastoral greeting of its diocesans, entering Beja on 18 August.  For ten more years, he was pontificate of the diocese of Beja, he was later transferred to become Bishop of Viseu.  The post of the Bishop of Beja was shortly taken by D. José António da Mata e Silva.

Bishop of Viseu
On 7 December 1859, he was transferred to become bishop of Viseu after succeeding D. José (III) Manuel de Lemos, he resigned from his chair and abandoned the Diocese as he was incapable to offer obedience to its fathers in material of clerical vestments, he was succeeded by D. António (IV) Alves Martins.  He returned to his house in Mogofores, he later died there in March 1862.

References

External links
José Xavier de Cerveira e Sousa at Infopedia 

1797 births
1862 deaths
19th-century Roman Catholic bishops in Portugal
Portuguese politicians
Bishops of Viseu